This is an incomplete List of ghost towns in Alaska.

Afognak (Kodiak Island Borough)
Akulurak.
Amalga (Juneau Borough)
Apollo
Aurora
Baldwin
Belcaro
Belkofski (Aleutians East Borough)
Bettles (Yukon-Koyukuk Census Area)
Big Port Walter
Calder
Cape Fanshaw
Caro
Chena (Fairbanks North Star Borough)
Chisana (Copper River Census Area)
Chisna
Chomly
Copper City
Coppermount
Council (Nome Census Area)
Curry (Matanuska-Susitna Borough)
Dickson (Nome Census Area)
Dyea (Municipality of Skagway Borough)
Flat (Yukon-Koyukuk Census Area)
Gilmore
Iditarod (Yukon-Koyukuk Census Area)
Independence Mines (Matanuska-Susitna Borough)
Kaguyak
Kalakaket
Katalla (Valdez-Cordova Census Area)
Kennicott (Copper River Census Area)
Kern (Kenai Peninsula Borough)
Kijik (Lake and Peninsula Borough)
King Island (Nome Census Area)
Knik (Matanuska-Susitna Borough)
Loring (Ketchikan Gateway Borough)
Mary's Igloo (Nome Census Area)
Meehan
Ohagamiut (Bethel Census Area)
Olnes
Ophir (Yukon-Koyukuk Census Area)
Pedro
Poorman (Yukon-Koyukuk Census Area)
Port Wakefield (Kodiak Island Borough)
Portage (Anchorage)
Portlock (Kenai Peninsula Borough)
Prospect Creek (Yukon-Koyukuk Census Area)
Seaside
Snettisham (Juneau)
Speel River
Sulzer (Prince of Wales-Hyder Census Area)
Three Saints Bay (Kodiak Island Borough)
Toklat
Tin City (Nome Census Area)
Unga (Aleutians East Borough)
York (Nome Census Area)

References

External links
 Alaska on Ghosttowns.com

Alaska
Ghost